Touhid Hossain Chowdhury is a Bangladeshi film editor. He won Bangladesh National Film Award for Best Editing for the film Desha: The Leader (2014)

Selected films

Awards and nominations
National Film Awards

References

External links

Bangladeshi editors
Best Editor National Film Award (Bangladesh) winners
Living people
Year of birth missing (living people)